Elfriede, also known as Elfreda, Elfrida, Alfrida, Elfrieda, Elftrude, Elftraut among other variants, is a female given name, derived from Ælfþryð (Aelfthryth) meaning "elf-strength". The name fell out of fashion in the Middle Ages and was revived in the 19th century in both England and Germany.  Although some of its modern forms like Alfieda can be mistaken for feminine versions of Alfred, that derives from Ælfræd ('elf-counsel' or 'wise-elf'). The Southern German diminutive Friedel or Friedl is nowadays more common than the full name.

Medieval 
 Saint Ælfflæd of Whitby, daughter of King Oswiu of Northumbria and Eanflæd, abbess of Whitby Abbey (654–714)
 Saint Ælfthryth of Crowland (died c. 795)
 Ælfthryth, wife of King Coenwulf of Mercia (fl. 810s)
 Ælfthryth, Countess of Flanders, daughter of King Alfred the Great (d. 929)
 Elftrude, daughter of Adele of Vermandois and Arnulf I, Count of Flanders (10th century)
 Ælfthryth, wife of Edgar, king of England, mother of Ethelred the Unready (d. 1000)

Modern 

 Elfrida Andrée (1841–1929), Swedish organist, composer and conductor
 Elfrida De Renne Barrow (1884–1970), American author and poet
 Elfriede Elfi von Dassanowsky (1924–2007), Austrian-born singer, pianist and film producer
 Elfriede Elfi Eder (born 1970), Austrian former alpine skier
 Elfriede Florin (1912–2006), German actress
 Elfriede Geiringer (1905–1998), Austrian Holocaust survivor, second wife of Otto Frank, father of Anne Frank
 Elfriede Gerstl (1932–2009), Austrian author and Holocaust survivor
 Elfriede Elfi Graf (born 1964), Austrian singer
 Elfriede Jelinek (born 1946), Austrian playwright, 2004 Nobel laureate in Literature
 Elfriede Lender (1882–1974), Estonian teacher and pedagogue
 Elfrida Pigou (1911–1960), Canadian mountaineer
 Elfrida Rathbone (1871–1940), English educationist
 Elfriede Rinkel (born 1922), guard at the Ravensbrück concentration camp
 Elfriede Saarik (1916–1983), Estonian dancer and stage actress
 Elfriede Scholz (1903–1943), German victim of Nazi persecution, sister of author Erich Maria Remarque 
 Alfreda "Freda" Simmonds (1912–1983), New Zealand artist
 Elfriede Trötschel (1913–1958), German soprano
 Elfrida Vipont, pen name of Elfrida Vipont Foulds (1902–1992), British author of children's books

See also
Aelfrida Tillyard (1883-1959), British author, medium and self-styled mystic

English given names
German feminine given names